This is a list of former sports teams from the US state of Pennsylvania:

Australian rules football

American leagues

United States Australian Football League
Lehigh Valley Crocs
Pittsburgh Wallabies

Baseball

Major baseball leagues

American Association (1882–1891)
Philadelphia Athletics (1882–1891)
Pittsburgh Alleghenys (1882–1886) (Now the Pittsburgh Pirates of the National League)

Federal League (1913–1915)
Pittsburgh Rebels (1913–1915)

National Association of Base Ball Players (1861–1870)
Athletic of Philadelphia

National Association of Professional Base Ball Players (1871–1875)
Philadelphia Athletics (1871–1875)
Philadelphia White Stockings (1873–1875) (also sometimes called "Pearls" or "Phillies")
Philadelphia Centennials (1875)

Negro leagues (1885–1951)
Harrisburg Giants (1924–1929)
Hilldale Daisies (1910–1932)
Philadelphia Giants
Philadelphia Pythians
Philadelphia Stars (1934–1948)
Philadelphia Tigers (1928)
Homestead Grays (1929–1948)
Pittsburgh Crawfords (1931–1938)
Pittsburgh Keystones

Players' League (1890)
Philadelphia Quakers/Athletics (PL/AA) (1890)
Pittsburgh Burghers (1890)

Union Association (1884)
Altoona Mountain Citys (1884)
Philadelphia Keystones (1884)
Pittsburgh Stogies (1884)

Minor League Baseball

Atlantic League of Professional Baseball
Lehigh Valley Black Diamonds (2000–2001)
Pennsylvania Road Warriors (2002–2004)

Eastern League (1923–current)
Allentown Brooks (1935–1936)
Allentown Cardinals (1935–1936)
Allentown Chiefs (1957)
Allentown Red Sox (1935–1936)
Johnstown Johnnies (1955–1956)
Johnstown Red Sox (1961)
Lancaster Red Roses (1896–1961)
Philadelphia Phillies (minor league) (1892)
Reading Brooks (1935–1936)
Reading Indians (1952–1957) (Now Reading Phillies)
Reading Red Sox (1933–1965) (Now Pittsfield Red Sox)
Scranton Red Sox
Wilkes-Barre Barons (1933–1972)
Wilkes-Barre Indians
Williamsport A's
Williamsport Bills (1987–1991)
Williamsport Grays (1924–1962)
Williamsport Mets (1964–1967)
Williamsport Tigers
Williamsport Tomahawks
York Pirates (1884–1969)
York White Roses (1884–1969)

Frontier League (1993–current)
Erie Sailors (1994) (became Johnstown Steal)
Johnstown Johnnies (1995–1997) (renamed Johnstown Johnnies)
Johnstown Johnnies (1998–2002) (now Florence Y'alls)

International League (1885–)
Scranton/Wilkes-Barre Red Barons (1998–2006) (renamed Scranton/Wilkes-Barre Yankees from 2007-2012)(Now Scranton/Wilkes-Barre RailRiders, renamed in 2013)

New York–Penn League (1939–)
Erie Cardinals
Erie Orioles (ended 1990) (changed name to "Sailors")
Erie Sailors (1990–1992)
Erie Tigers
Williamsport Astros (1971–1972)
Williamsport Red Sox (1971–1972)

Heartland League
Altoona Rail Kings (1997)

North Atlantic League
Altoona Rail Kings (1996)

Northern League
Allentown Ambassadors (1997–2003)

Basketball

Major basketball leagues

National Basketball Association (NBA)
Philadelphia Warriors (1946–1962) now the Golden State Warriors
Pittsburgh Ironmen (1946–1947)

Minor basketball leagues

American Basketball Association (1967–1976)
Pennsylvania Pit Bulls (2004–2005)
Pittsburgh Condors (1970–1972)
Pittsburgh Hardhats (2004)
Pittsburgh Pipers (1967–1968)

American Basketball League
Scranton Miners (1950?–1996)

Continental Basketball Association
Pittsburgh Piranhas (1994–1995)
Pittsburgh Xplosion (2005–2008)
Wilkes-Barre Barons (1914–1978)

National Alliance of Basketball Leagues(1938–)
Philadelphia Tapers (1962–1963)

United States Basketball League
Philadelphia Aces
Philadelphia Spirit
Pennsylvania ValleyDawgs (1999–2007)

Women's Basketball League
 Philadelphia Fox 1979 (folded mid-season)

Football

Major football leagues

Early athletic clubs
Allegheny Athletic Association
Duquesne Country and Athletic Club
Franklin Athletic Club
Greensburg Athletic Association
Homestead Library & Athletic Club
Jeanette Athletic Association
Latrobe Athletic Association
McKeesport Olympics
Oil City Athletic Club
Pittsburgh Athletic Club (football)

American Association (football)
Bethlehem Bulldogs
Wilkes-Barre Bullets
Erie Vets

American Football League (1926)
Philadelphia Quakers (1926)

American Football League (1936)
Pittsburgh Americans

Anthracite League
Coaldale Big Green
Gilberton Cadamounts
Shenandoah Yellow Jackets
Wilkes-Barre Barons (football)

Eastern League of Professional Football
All-Lancaster Red Roses
Bethlehem Bears
Mount Carmel Wolverines
Shenandoah Red Jackets

National Football League
Dallas Texans (NFL) (1951–1952) (Traveling team based in Hershey, Pennsylvania)
Frankford Yellow Jackets (1924–1928)
Pottsville Maroons (1925–1928)

World War II merger teams
Chicago-Pittsburgh "Card-Pitt" (1944)
Pitt-Phil "Steagles" (1943)

Mid Continental Football League
Erie Hawks

National Football League (1902)
Philadelphia Athletics (NFL)
Philadelphia Phillies (NFL)
Pittsburgh Stars

United States Football League
Philadelphia Stars (1983–1985)
Pittsburgh Maulers (1984)

World Football League
Philadelphia Bell (1974–1975)

Pennsylvania Professional Football League (1946–1949 )

 Eastern Division
 Shamokin Indians
 Pottsville Maroons
 Shenandoah Presidents
 Allentown Buccaneers
 York Roses
 Harrisburg Senators
 Philadelphia Yellow Jackets
 Western Division
 McKeesport-Duquesne Ironmen
 New Kensington Alumineers
 Johnstown Clippers
 McKees Rocks Rockets
 Altoona Mountanineers
 Jeannette Boosters

Anthracite Professional Football League (1949)

 Shamokin Maroons
 Tamaqua
 Mahanoy City
 Hazleton

Arena/indoor football

Arena Football League
Pittsburgh Gladiators (1987–1990) (now the Tampa Bay Storm)
Philadelphia Soul (2004–2019)

American Indoor Football Association
Johnstown Riverhawks (2005–2007)
Erie Freeze (2005–2007)

Continental Football League
Philadelphia Bulldogs 1965–1966

Indoor Football League
 Erie Invaders (2000)

National Indoor Football League
Johnstown J Dogs (2000–2001)

Hockey

Major hockey associations

National Hockey League
Pittsburgh Pirates (NHL) (1925–1930)
Philadelphia Quakers (NHL) (1930–1931)

World Hockey Association
Philadelphia Blazers (1972–1973)

Western Pennsylvania Hockey League
Duquesne Athletic Club (1908–1909)
Duquesne Country and Athletic Club (1895–1901)
Pittsburgh Athletic Club (1895–1904, 1907–1909)
Pittsburgh Bankers (1899–1904, 1907–1909)
Pittsburgh Keystones (1900–1904)
Pittsburgh Lyceum (1907–1908)
Pittsburgh Pirates (1907–1908)
Pittsburgh Victorias (1902–1904)

Minor leagues

American Hockey League
Erie Blades (1975–1982)
Philadelphia Firebirds (1974–1979)
Philadelphia Arrows (1927–1935) (Became Philadelphia Ramblers)
Philadelphia Ramblers (1935–1941)
Philadelphia Rockets (1941–1942)
Philadelphia Phantoms (1996–2009)
Pittsburgh Hornets (1936–1956, 1961–1967)

East Coast Hockey League/ECHL
Erie Panthers (1988–1996)
Johnstown Chiefs (1988–2010)

Eastern Hockey League
Erie Blades (1979–1981)
Hershey B'ars/Hershey Bears (1933–1938)
Hershey Cubs (1938–1939)
Johnstown Bluebirds (1941–1942)
Johnstown Jets (1950–1977)
Johnstown Red Wings (1979–1980)
Philadelphia Falcons (1942–1946; 1951–1952)
Philadelphia Ramblers (1955–1964)

International Hockey League (1929–36)
Pittsburgh Shamrocks (1935–1936)
Pittsburgh Yellow Jackets (1915–1925, 1930–1932)

Mid-Atlantic Hockey League
Mon Valley Thunder (2007–2008)
Valley Forge Freedom (2007–2008)

North American Hockey League
Keystone Ice Miners (2014–2015)
Pittsburgh Forge (2001–2004)

Roller Hockey International
Philadelphia Bulldogs (1994–1996)
Pittsburgh Phantoms (1994)

Lacrosse

Major American leagues

National Lacrosse League
Pittsburgh Bulls (1990–1993)
Pittsburgh CrosseFire (2000)
Philadelphia Wings (1974–1975)
Philadelphia Wings (1987–2014)

Soccer

Major leagues

North American Soccer League
Philadelphia Atoms (1973–1976)
Philadelphia Fury (1978–1980)

Minor leagues

Continental Soccer League
Pittsburgh Stingers

American Soccer League
Pennsylvania Stoners 1979–1983

Major Indoor Soccer League
Pittsburgh Spirit (1978–1980)
Philadelphia Fever (1978–1980)

National Professional Soccer League
Pittsburgh Phantoms (1967)
Philadelphia Spartans 1967

United Soccer Leagues Second Division
Philadelphia Freedom (1994–1997)

USL Championship
Penn FC (2003–2018; known as Harrisburg City Islanders before the 2018 season)

Women's United Soccer Association
Philadelphia Charge 2002–2003

Women's Professional Soccer
Philadelphia Independence 2010–2011

Softball

Men's Professional Softball

APSPL, NASL, UPSL
Pittsburgh Champions (1980, NASL)
Pittsburgh Hardhats (1977-1982, APSPL, USPL)
Philadelphia Athletics  (1977-1980, APSPL)

References

 
Pennsylvania
Pennsylvania sports-related lists